Moshe Ziffer (24 April 1902 – 9 April 1989) was an Israeli artist and sculptor.

Biography
Moshe Ziffer was born in 1902 in Przemyśl, Austria-Hungary. He immigrated to Mandate Palestine in 1919. In 1924–33, he studied sculpture in Vienna, Berlin and Paris. Stone sculptures by Ziffer are on display at the campuses of Tel Aviv University and the Hebrew University of Jerusalem. Ziffer bequeathed his sculpture garden in Safed to the Safed Municipality. He left his home in Tel Aviv and many of his sculptures to Tel Aviv University.
 
Ziffer died in 1989 in Tel Aviv.

Awards and recognition
Albert Einstein said of Ziffer:"Du bist ein Ziffer und ich bin Ein stein aber du arbeitest mit stein und ich arbeite mit ziffern" ("You are a figure (ziffer—figure, digit, number) and I am a stone (ein stein) but you work with stone and I work with figures").
Einstein also described his work as "simple and noble as the man who created it."

In 1947–48, Ziffer was awarded the Dizengoff Prize in Sculpture, for his design of a wall at Haganah House, Tel Aviv.

Environmental sculptures
1938, "Unknown Pioneer", at New York International Fair
Memorial in honour of the breakthrough at the Burma Road, Hulda
Memorial in honour of the fighters of the Givati Brigade and members of Kibbutz Nitzanim killed in the 1947–1949 Palestine war, 
Sculpture Garden, Safed
1958, "Lot's Wife", Brussels International Exhibition

Portrait busts 
Ziffer sculpted busts of Albert Einstein, David Ben-Gurion and Chaim Weizmann.

References

Further reading
Ziffer, Moshe; with Jonel Jianou, Arted, Paris, France 
Tal, Miriam (text).—Ziffer Sculpture Garden Artists Colony Safad,
United Artists, Tel Aviv, 1972.

External links

Ziffer House: Documentation and Research Center of Israeli Visual Arts

Israeli sculptors
Austro-Hungarian Jews
Jews in Mandatory Palestine
20th-century Israeli Jews
1902 births
1989 deaths
20th-century sculptors